Valea lui Mihai is a town in Bihor County, Crișana, Romania.

Geography
It is crossed by national road , which runs from Oradea all the way to Sighetu Marmației, on the border with Ukraine.

History
In 1312, under Charles I, it was allowed new trade privileges and then in 1459 was also allowed tax benefits privileges for its citizens. Later it was part of the Ottoman Empire, which resulted in its depopulation, but the inhabitants subsequently returned. Thereafter, it was part of the Habsburg monarchy up until the Austro-Hungarian Compromise of 1867. Then it became part of the Kingdom of Hungary within Austria-Hungary. 

After the collapse of Austria-Hungary at the end of World War I, and the declaration of the Union of Transylvania with Romania, the Romanian Army took control of the town in the spring of 1919, during the Hungarian–Romanian War. Valea lui Mihai officially became part of the territory ceded to the Kingdom of Romania in June 1920 under the terms of the Treaty of Trianon. After the administrative unification law in 1925, the town became the seat of plasa Valea lui Mihai in Sălaj County. In August 1940, under the auspices of Nazi Germany, which imposed the Second Vienna Award, Hungary retook the territory of Northern Transylvania (which included Valea lui Mihai) from Romania. Towards the end of World War II, however, the town was taken back from Hungarian and German troops by Romanian and Soviet forces in October 1944, during the initial stages of the Battle of Debrecen; it became again part of Romania in March 1945. Following the administrative reform of 1950, Valea lui Mihai became part of Săcueni Raion within Bihor Region (renamed Oradea Region in 1952 and Crișana Region in 1960). In 1968, the old territorial division into județe was reinstituted, and Valea lui Mihai became part of Bihor County. It was declared a town on three separate occasions: in 1844, 1930, and 1989, the last time as a result of the Romanian rural systematization program.

Jewish history
Jews from Galicia settled around 1780, engaging in agriculture and commerce. A junior high school was opened in 1873. Anschel Bak opened a printing press in the late 19th century. Fifty Hungarian Hasidic rabbis held a convention in the town in 1898.

In 1930, there were 1,535 Jews, or 19% of the total population. During the interwar period, Jews were the leaders of local industry, employing hundreds of workers. Some Zionist youth groups were founded in the 1930s. In 1935, the town was the site of the HaNoar HaTzioni national convention.

The Jewish population was sent by the Hungarian authorities to the Oradea ghetto in May 1944 and subsequently deported to Auschwitz. Some of the survivors returned briefly to the town after the war.

Population

According to the census from 2011, there were 9,668  people living within the town. Of this population, 81.03% are ethnic Hungarians, while 13.23% are ethnic Romanians, and 1.3% others.

Image gallery

References

External links

 Valea lui Mihai - ShtetLink

Populated places in Bihor County
Localities in Crișana
Towns in Romania
Hungary–Romania border crossings
Hungarian communities in Romania